Merrifield is a surname.

List of people with the surname 

 Andy Merrifield (born 1960), British Marxist urban theorist
 Charles T. Merrifield (–1957), American uranium miner and murder victim
 Charles Watkins Merrifield (1827–1884), British mathematician
 Dave Merrifield (born 1941), Canadian ice hockey player
 Donald Merrifield (1928–2010), American Jesuit
 Eric Mowbray Merrifield, South African engineer, inventor of the dolos
 Flora Merrifield (1859–1943), British suffragist
 Frankie Merrifield (born 1994), English footballer
 Frederick Merrifield (1831–1924), English lepidopterist
 John H. Merrifield (1847–1906), American politician
 Lane Merrifield, Canadian entrepreneur, co-creator of Club Penguin
 Leonard Stanford Merrifield (1880–1943), British sculptor
 Lester Levern Merrifield (1921–2000), American orthodontist
 Louisa May Merrifield (1906–1953), British poisoner
 Mary Philadelphia Merrifield (1804–1889), British algologist and writer
 Michael Merrifield (born 1946/47), American politician
 Michael Merrifield, English astronomer and professor
 Ralph Merrifield (1913–1995), English museum curator and archaeologist
 Renee Merrifield, Canadian politician
 Rob Merrifield (born 1953), Canadian politician and diplomat
 Robert Bruce Merrifield (1921–2006), American biochemist, inventor of solid phase peptide synthesis
 Samuel Merrifield (1904–1982), Australian politician
 Webster Merrifield (1852–1916), American educator and academic
 Whit Merrifield (born 1989), American baseball player
 William Merrifield (1890–1943), Canadian Victoria Cross recipient

See also 

 Merrifield (disambiguation)
 Merryfield

Surnames
English-language surnames
Surnames of English origin
Surnames of British Isles origin